Henry Burton Conyngham, 1st Marquess Conyngham,  (26 December 1766 – 28 December 1832), known as The Lord Conyngham between 1787 and 1789, as The Viscount Conyngham (2nd creation) between 1789 and 1797 and as The Earl Conyngham (2nd creation) between 1797 and 1815, was an Anglo-Irish courtier and politician of the Regency period. He served as Lord Steward between 1821 and 1830.

Background
Conyngham was born in London, England, the elder twin son of Francis Conyngham, 2nd Baron Conyngham, by his wife Elizabeth Clements, daughter of Nathaniel Clements. He was the elder twin brother of Sir Francis Conyngham and the nephew of William Conyngham.

Political career
Conyngham succeeded his father in the barony in May 1787, aged twenty. In May 1789 he was elected a Fellow of the Society of Antiquaries. In December of the same year, he was created Viscount Conyngham, of Slane in the County of Meath, in the Peerage of Ireland. He was further honoured when he was made Viscount Mount Charles, of Mount Charles in the County of Donegal, and Earl Conyngham, of Mount Charles in the County of Donegal, in the Irish peerage in 1797. 

In August 1800, he was elected as one of the twenty-eight original Irish representative peers to sit in the British House of Lords. 

He was made a Knight of St Patrick the following year (1801). In 1803, he was appointed Governor of County Donegal, a post he held until 1831, and Custos Rotulorum of County Clare in 1808, which he remained until his death. 

In January 1816, he was created Viscount Slane, in the County of Meath, Earl of Mount Charles and Marquess Conyngham, of the County of Donegal, in the Irish peerage. In July 1821, he was created Baron Minster, of Minster Abbey in the County of Kent, in the Peerage of the United Kingdom. 

In December 1821, he was sworn of the Privy Council and appointed Lord Steward, a post he retained until 1830. 

From 1829 until his death in 1832 he served as Constable and Governor of Windsor Castle.

Family
Lord Conyngham married Elizabeth Denison, daughter of the wealthy banker Joseph Denison. They had three sons and two daughters. Their eldest son, Henry Conyngham, Earl of Mount Charles, predeceased his father. Their third son Lord Albert Conyngham succeeded to the vast Denison estates on the death of his maternal uncle, assumed the surname Denison and was created Baron Londesborough in 1850. The Marchioness Conyngham was a mistress of George IV. Lord Conyngham died at Hamilton Place, London, in December 1832, aged 66, and was succeeded by his second but eldest surviving son, Francis. The Marchioness Conyngham died in Canterbury, Kent, in October 1861.

References

Citations

Bibliography
Cook, C. & Stevenson, J. (1980). British Historical Facts 1760–1830. London and Basingstoke: The Macmillan Press Ltd.

External links

|-

|-

|-

1766 births
1832 deaths
Knights of St Patrick
Members of the Privy Council of the United Kingdom
Irish representative peers
Henry
Fellows of the Society of Antiquaries of London
Members of the Irish House of Lords
Marquesses Conyngham
Peers of the United Kingdom created by George IV